Adam Peter Willis (born 21 September 1976) is an English former professional footballer who played as a central defender who made over 100 appearances in the Football League.

Career
Born in Nuneaton, Willis began his career with Coventry City. However, he never made an appearance for the first team, and instead made his professional debut in 1998 with Swindon Town. Between 1998 and 2003, Willis made a total of 92 league appearances for Swindon. While at Swindon, Willis played 10 league games on loan at Mansfield Town. Willis later played for Kidderminster Harriers, making 12 league appearances during the 2003–04 season. While at Kidderminster, Willis spent a loan spell at non-league Burton Albion, and after leaving Kidderminster in 2004, signed for non-league club Hinckley United.

Personal life
Willis graduated from the University of Worcester gaining a first class honours degree in Physical Education and then going on to complete the Graduate Teacher Programme to become a Secondary PE Teacher.

References

External links

1976 births
Living people
English footballers
Coventry City F.C. players
Swindon Town F.C. players
Mansfield Town F.C. players
Kidderminster Harriers F.C. players
Burton Albion F.C. players
Hinckley United F.C. players
English Football League players
Alumni of the University of Worcester
Schoolteachers from Warwickshire
Association football defenders